The A-3149 (LS-750) and A-3171 (LS-800) were diesel-electric switching locomotives built between November 1949 and June 1951, by the Lima-Hamilton Corporation of Lima, Ohio, U.S.A.. The A-3149 is a  switcher. Both models used the same turbocharged Hamilton T69SA four-stroke, six cylinder inline diesel engine, a Westinghouse generator and 4 Westinghouse traction motors.

All six A-3149’s were sold to a single railroad, Cincinnati Union Terminal (CUT class DES-10w) with two (#24-25) being sold after the A-3171 had been introduced. The 23 A-3171’s were sold to just two railroads, the Chicago, Rock Island and Pacific bought 2, and Chicago River and Indiana (a subsidiary of the New York Central System, CR&I class DES-19a) bought 21. 

Lima-Hamilton did not assign model numbers to their models but referred to them by specification numbers. Model designations such as LS-750 or LS-800 were a railfan invention. Lima-Hamilton assigned A-3149 as the specification number for the 750 hp model, and A-3171 as the specification number for the 800 hp model.

Original owners

A-3149

A-3171

Preservation
The last extant A-3149, former Cincinnati Union Terminal 25, is operated by the Whitewater Valley Railroad

References 

B-B locomotives
LS-0750
Railway locomotives introduced in 1949
Standard gauge locomotives of the United States